The 1923 West Virginia Mountaineers football team was an American football team that represented West Virginia University as an independent during the 1923 college football season. In its third season under head coach Clarence Spears, the team compiled a 7–1–1 record and outscored opponents by a combined total of 297 to 41.

Schedule

References

West Virginia
West Virginia Mountaineers football seasons
West Virginia Mountaineers football